The 1970 Giro di Lombardia was the 64th edition of the Giro di Lombardia cycle race and was held on 10 October 1970. The race started in Milan and finished in Como. The race was won by Franco Bitossi of the Filotex team.

General classification

References

1970
Giro di Lombardia
Giro di Lombardia
1970 Super Prestige Pernod